Southern Comfort is a 1974 album by jazz fusion band The Crusaders.

Reception

The AllMusic reviewer Jason Elias wrote: "A good representation of the Crusaders' tasteful and intelligent playing, Southern Comfort is more than recommended to their fans."

Track listing 
"Stomp And Buck Dance" (Wayne Henderson)
"Greasy Spoon" (Stix Hooper)
"Get On The Soul Ship" (Joe Sample)
"Super Stuff" (Henderson)
"Double Bubble" (Sample)
"The Well's Gone Dry" (Larry Carlton)
"Southern Comfort" (Henderson)
"Time Bomb" (Sample)
"When There's Love Around" (Hooper)
"Lilies Of The Nile" (Wilton Felder)
"Whispering Pines" (Henderson)
"A Ballad For Joe (Louis)" (Sample)

Personnel
The Crusaders
Wayne Henderson - Trombone
Wilton Felder - Bass, Saxophone
Joe Sample - Keyboards
Stix Hooper - Drums
Larry Carlton - Guitar

Charts

Singles

References

External links
 Crusaders-Southern Comfort  at Discogs

The Crusaders albums
1974 albums
Albums produced by Stewart Levine
ABC Records albums
Blue Thumb Records albums